Zachary Philip Katznelson is a lawyer and formerly Legal Director for the human rights group Reprieve.

Katznelson and his colleagues represented over 50 people imprisoned in Guantanamo Bay. He has written numerous newspaper op-eds and was frequently quoted in the British press.

Comments on Guantanamo captives' cases
The BBC News quoted Katznelson's comments following the release of Bisher Al Rawi:

{| class="wikitable" border="1"
|

|}

On 6 September 2009, Katznelson made what The Guardian characterised as "extraordinary claims" on behalf of his client Shaker Aamer.

He repeated accounts Aamer had offered him of severe abuse during his initial interrogations in the Bagram Theater Internment Facility. Aamer claimed some of the interrogators who abused him in Bagram, in early 2002, represented themselves as MI5 officers. Aamer told him about feeling terrified as he recovered from one stunning beating that his interrogators had left him alone in a room with a pistol on the table. Aamer told him that the interrogators who represented themselves as MI5 officers offered him a choice. If he agreed to spy on suspected jihadists living in the UK he could be released to the United Kingdom. Alternatively he could remain indefinitely American custody. Commenting on Aamer's report that he had been left alone with a gun Katznelson said:

Commenting on Aamer's report that MI5 had tried to recruit him as a spy Katznelson said:

References

Place of birth missing (living people)
Year of birth missing (living people)
Living people
Guantanamo Bay attorneys
British lawyers
British activists